is a private university in Ōdate, Akita Prefecture, Japan, established in 2005.

External links
 Official website 

Educational institutions established in 2005
Private universities and colleges in Japan
Universities and colleges in Akita Prefecture
2005 establishments in Japan
Nursing schools in Japan
Ōdate